Tulio Larrínaga (January 15, 1847 – April 28, 1917) was a Resident Commissioner of Puerto Rico.

Biography 
Born in Trujillo Alto, Puerto Rico, Larrínaga attended the Seminario Consiliar of San Ildefonso at San Juan, Puerto Rico. He studied civil engineering at the Rensselaer Polytechnic Institute in Troy, New York and, in 1871, graduated from the University of Pennsylvania in Philadelphia.

Larrínaga practiced his profession in the United States for some time, returning to Puerto Rico in 1872 where he was appointed architect for the city of San Juan. In 1880, Larrínaga built the first railroad in Puerto Rico and introduced American rolling stock onto the island. For ten years he was the chief engineer of the Provincial Works.

Larrínaga's involvement in politics began in 1898, when he was appointed Assistant Secretary of the Interior in the Autonomist government. Two years later, he was sent by his party as a delegate to Washington, DC.

Larrínaga served as member of the house of delegates for the district of Arecibo in 1902. In 1904, he was elected as a Unionist Resident Commissioner to the United States. He was reelected twice, serving from March 4, 1905, until March 3, 1911.
Larrínaga also served as delegate from the United States to the Third Pan-American Conference held in Rio de Janeiro in 1906. In 1911, he served as a member of the executive council of Puerto Rico.

Following his political career, Larrínaga resumed the practice of civil engineering in San Juan. He died there on April 28, 1917 and was interred at  	
Cementerio Municipal de Mayagüez in Mayagüez, Puerto Rico.

See also
 List of Hispanic Americans in the United States Congress

References

Sources

1847 births
1917 deaths
19th-century American politicians
Puerto Rican civil engineers
People from Trujillo Alto, Puerto Rico
Puerto Rican people of Basque descent
Rensselaer Polytechnic Institute alumni
Republican Party members of the United States House of Representatives
Resident Commissioners of Puerto Rico
Union of Puerto Rico politicians
University of Pennsylvania alumni